Cronquistia is a genus of flowering plants in the daisy family, Asteraceae.

It contains only one known species, Cronquistia pringlei, endemic to Mexico (States of Chihuahua and Durango).

References

Eupatorieae
Endemic flora of Mexico
Monotypic Asteraceae genera